Joris Ambroise Bruno Bado, (born May 20, 1991) is a Burkinabé professional basketball player.  He currently plays for the Basket Club Montbrison Sports Club of the NM2 in France. Bado is one of Burkina Faso's most prominent basketball figures.

He played most minutes for the Burkina Faso national basketball team at the 2013 FIBA Africa Championship in Abidjan, Ivory Coast.

References

External links
FIBA Profile
Eurobasket.com Profile

1991 births
Living people
Burkinabé men's basketball players
Burkinabé people of French descent
People from Cognac, France
Shooting guards
Small forwards
21st-century Burkinabé people
Sportspeople from Charente